Cominella glandiformis, or the mud whelk or mud-flat whelk is a species of predatory sea snail, a marine gastropod mollusc in the family Cominellidae.

References

 Powell A W B, New Zealand Mollusca, William Collins Publishers Ltd, Auckland, New Zealand 1979 

Cominellidae
Gastropods of New Zealand
Gastropods described in 1847